Pachadi refers to a traditional South Indian fresh pickle served as a side dish. Broadly translated, it refers to food which has been pounded. In Andhra Pradesh, Telangana, Karnataka, Kerala and Tamil Nadu, pachadi is a side dish similar to the North Indian raita, and is made with vegetable, yoghurt, coconut, ginger and curry leaves and seasoned with mustard. Pachadi generally is a hot or mildly spiced coconut, green chillies, red chillies and yogurt-based dish made with seasonal vegetables or fruits.
 
It is made of fresh vegetables and is served as an accompaniment for rice and for snacks like idli, dosa, and pesarattu. Many kinds of vegetables are included.

Varieties

In Andhra Pradesh and Telangana
 Vegetable pachadi is made with vegetables like bottle gourd, aubergine, and okra. The vegetable is cooked al dente and is ground with roasted red/green chiles, fenugreek seeds and mustard seeds.
 Greens pachadi: The most popular one is Gongura pachadi made out of red sorrel leaves and roasted red chiles. It is unique to Andhra cuisine and is a must have for any meal that gives a taste of Andhra. Other than this, chukka koora (a variety of sour leafy green found in AP) pachadi is also very popular. Chutney is also made out of coriander/curry leaves. This is normally consumed as a modati mudda item.

Buttermilk mixed with the tender dabbakaya leaves (dabbaku majjiga) is supposed to quench extreme thirst during the hot summer months.

In Karnataka
Thambuli is a type of fresh pickle eaten in the Indian state of Karnataka. Thambuli, being a curd based cuisine, is consumed with hot rice along with hot sambar usually. Tambuli is derived from Kannada word thampu ( ---->), meaning cool/cold. So thambuli is a cooling food. It is made mostly from many greens and carrot, beetroot like vegetables as their main ingredients. It is prepared by grinding the vegetable with the spices and then mixing it with yogurt. All ingredients are used raw (as they are) without any cooking.

Thambuli/Tambli/Tambuli is a form of fresh pickle. There are many varieties of Thumbuli: Menthe Thumbuli, shunti (ginger) thaumbuli, and various other herbal thambulis.

Many different seasonal vegetables/herbs can be used in the preparation of thambulis, such as doddapatre leaves (ajwain leaves/karibevu leaves), coriander leaves, poppy seeds, curry leaves and so on. Various recipes for the same exist, with slight variations in the ingredients. Thambuli/Tambli is generally prepared mild and not spicy. Fundamentally, thambuli/tambli has a few simple whole spices, roasted and ground with seasonal vegetables or herbs (some with coconut) added to buttermilk/curds. Tambuli is another authentic Karnataka recipe.

In Kerala and Tamil Nadu

In Tamil Nadu, pachadi is eaten fresh and typically made of finely chopped and boiled vegetables such as cucumber or ash gourd, with coconut, green or red chillis and tempered in oil with mustard seeds, ginger and curry leaves. Pachadi is commonly eaten with rice and a lentil curry.

In Kerala, pachadi is prepared in curd as in Tamil Nadu. Along with the sour Pachadi, there exits a sweet variant in Kerala, made with pineapple, grapes or pumpkin. Many varieties made of the same key recipe exist in different parts of Kerala. It is served at restaurants along with Vegetable Thali Rice. It is also included with Sadhya, especially with Kerala Sadhya popular during Onam and Vishu festivals.

See also
 Achaar, Indian spiced pickle
 Ugadi Pachadi, juice prepared on New Year day

References

External links

Indian Pachadi

Indian condiments
Telangana cuisine
Andhra cuisine
Kerala cuisine

te:పచ్చడి